Borommarachathirat III or Borom Rachathirat III was the king of Ayutthaya from 1488 to 1491. He was a son of Trailokanat and served as Trailokanat’s regent in Ayutthaya during his father’s campaigns against Lanna in the north. Trailokanat died in 1488 and Borommarachathirat succeeded his father. Upon ascension, he moved the capital back to Ayutthaya. The throne of Sukhothai at Pitsanulok, however, was succeeded by his brother Prince Chettathirat.

His reign, however, was short. He sent Siamese armies to capture the Mon city of Dawei in 1491 and died the same year.

He was succeeded by his brother Prince Chettathirat as Ramathibodi II.

Ancestry

References

1491 deaths
Suphannaphum dynasty
Kings of Ayutthaya
Year of birth unknown
15th-century monarchs in Asia
Princes of Ayutthaya
15th-century Thai people